Gary Greenberg is an American comparative and developmental psychologist who is Professor Emeritus of Psychology at Wichita State University.

Bio 
Greenberg was born and raised in Brooklyn, New York. He received his B.S. degree from Brooklyn College in 1961, followed by an M.A. degree from the University of Wichita in 1964 and a Ph.D. from Kansas State University in 1970. He then began working with Ethel Tobach in the Department of Animal Behavior at the American Museum of Natural History. In 1983, Greenberg co-founded the Southwestern Comparative Psychology Association (with Michael Domjan, Del Thiessen, and Steve Davis) and the International Society for Comparative Psychology (with Ethel Tobach). After teaching at Wichita State University for 40 years, he retired and moved to Chicago, Illinois.

As of 2008, Greenberg is a life member of the American Psychological Association (APA) and secretary of the International Society of Comparative Psychology. In 2015, he received the Clifford T. Morgan Distinguished Service to Div. 6 Award from the APA's division 6, the Society for Behavioral Neuroscience and Comparative Psychology.

On Psychiatry

Selected publications

References

External links
Faculty page

Living people
21st-century American psychologists
Anti-psychiatry
Wichita State University faculty
Comparative psychologists
American developmental psychologists
People from Brooklyn
Brooklyn College alumni
Wichita State University alumni
Kansas State University alumni
Year of birth missing (living people)